Acanthophiobolus is a genus in the Tubeufiaceae family of fungi.

References

External links
Acanthophiobolus at Index Fungorum

Tubeufiaceae